The International Alliance of App-based Transport Workers (IAATW) is a global union federation of ridesharing and other gig transport workers.

History
IAATW was founded in January 2020 during an international conference of app-based transport trade unions hosted by the UPHD which is now branded as App Drivers & Couriers Union, with financial support from the Open Society Foundations.

During the conference, organisers and drivers shared success stories and challenges, reflecting on the global nature of the gig economy as well as country specific challenges, like Proposition 22 in California.

In July 2020, IAATW together with the App Drivers and Couriers Union and NGO Worker Info Exchange started a campaign of supporting Uber drivers in filing legal complaints against the company for failing to provide access to their personal data.

In February 2021, UK judges ruled in favour of IAATW-affiliated members App Drivers & Couriers Union that Uber drivers should be considered as workers. Afterwards, IAATW affiliates relaunched a similar case in South Africa and considered opening one in Nigeria.

Affiliates
 Rideshare Driver Network 
 App Drivers and Couriers Union 
 Union of Private Hire Drivers 
 Association of Drivers of Digital and Similar Platforms 
 Association of Drivers of Technological Platforms and Related 
 Association of Uruguayan App Drivers 
 United Association of App Drivers 
 Union of Owners of App and Internet drivers 
 Dhaka Ride-Sharing Drivers Union 
 Indian Federation Of App Based Transport Workers 
 Independent Democracy of Informal Economy Association 
 Malaysia E-Hailing Drivers Association 
 National Union Of Professional App-Based Transport Workers 
 National Union of Public Service and Allied Workers 
 The Movement 
 TRIP SA NOW CCOP 
 Boston Independent Drivers Guild 
 Chicago Rideshare Advocates 
 Gig Workers Rising 
 New York Taxi Workers Alliance 
 Philadelphia Drivers Union 
 Philadelphia Limousine Association 
 Rideshare Drivers United 
 Toronto Limousine Drivers Association

See also 

 International Transport Workers' Federation

References

Global union federations
2020 establishments
Trade unions established in 2020